Founded in 1958 by Boris Koutzen and other musicians from the NBC Symphony who were residents of Chappaqua, New York and neighboring towns in Westchester County, the Chappaqua Orchestra annually presents a season of orchestral and chamber concerts.  Renowned conductor Andrew Litton's first conducting directorship was with the Chappaqua Orchestra, and the orchestra has also been conducted by Norman Leyden, Wolfgang Schanzer, Jesse Levine, and James Sadewhite.  The orchestra has premiered and commissioned works from composers such as Paul Creston, John Corigliano, Lowell Liebermann, Michael Jeffrey Shapiro, Emily Wong, and David Macdonald.  Soloists such as Vanessa L. Williams, Ruth Laredo, Joseph Fuchs, Kikuei Ikeda, Jerome Rose, Jon Manasse, Tim Fain, and others have appeared with the orchestra.  Michael Jeffrey Shapiro is currently the orchestra's Music Director and Conductor.

References

External links
http://www.chappaquaorchestra.org Official web site

American orchestras
Culture of Westchester County, New York
Musical groups from New York (state)
Musical groups established in 1958
1958 establishments in New York (state)